Prokoenenia wheeleri is a species of microscorpion in the family Prokoeneniidae.

References

Palpigradi
Articles created by Qbugbot
Animals described in 1901